Kelch repeat and BTB domain containing 11 is a protein that in humans is encoded by the KBTBD11 gene.

References

Further reading